Ortaklar is a town in Germencik district of Aydın Province, Turkey. The population of the town was 12945 as of 2012. The village was founded after 1886 when the railroad from İzmir to Aydın was constructed. After the Balkan wars, the Turkish refugees from Greece were settled in the village and being on the stop of railroad and close to the D.320 state highway the village was quickly flourished. In 1949 it was declared township. It is a typical Aegean Region town. Figs and grapes are the most important products

References

Populated places in Aydın Province
Towns in Turkey
Germencik District